Vitali Krylov is a paralympic swimmer from Russia competing mainly in category B2 events.

Career 
Krylov competed at two Paralympics for two different NPC's, firstly in 1992 competing for the Unified Team and then as a member of the Russian team he competed in the 1996 Summer Paralympics. In 1992 he won gold in both the 100m and 200m breaststroke setting new world records in both distances. He also finished seventh in the 50m freestyle, fourth in the 100m butterfly and seventh in the 200m medley. At the 1996 games Krylov finished third in both the 100m and 200m breastroke behind Australian Kingsley Bugarin who set world records in both events and in the 200m behind Denmark's Christian Bundgaard who set a B1 class world record. He also swam in the 50m freestyle finishing tenth and slowest in the heats therefore missing the final.

References

External links
 

Year of birth missing (living people)
Place of birth missing (living people)
Living people
Russian male breaststroke swimmers
Russian male freestyle swimmers
Russian male medley swimmers
Paralympic swimmers of Russia
Paralympic gold medalists for the Unified Team
Paralympic bronze medalists for Russia
Paralympic medalists in swimming
Swimmers at the 1992 Summer Paralympics
Swimmers at the 1996 Summer Paralympics
Medalists at the 1992 Summer Paralympics
Medalists at the 1996 Summer Paralympics